António Duarte Montez (4 April 1885 – 1968) was a Portuguese sports shooter. He competed in the 25 m rapid fire pistol event at the 1924 Summer Olympics.

References

External links
 

1885 births
1968 deaths
Portuguese male sport shooters
Olympic shooters of Portugal
Shooters at the 1924 Summer Olympics
Place of birth missing